Galore is the third studio album by the British band The Primitives, first released in Europe in January 1992. It was not released in the UK until 13 April 1992. It was the final album recorded by the group in their first existence, as they disbanded shortly after this release. They would not record again until 2010, and would not release another album until 2012's Echoes and Rhymes.

Galore was reissued in an expanded double-CD edition by Cherry Red Records in January 2015.

Reception

In a retrospective review, Jake Kennedy of Record Collector said he would "love to pronounce it the overlooked gem" of the band's career "but, in truth, it's muddled by a mix of producers". He added that it is unsuccessful in "shak[ing] off the baggage and tiredness that originally signposted it as an endpoint" in their career.

Track listing
All tracks composed by Paul Court; except where indicated
"You Are the Way" (Paul Court, Ian Broudie) - 3:32
"Lead Me Astray" - 3:16 
"Earth Thing" - 4:20 
"Give This World to You" - 4:04 
"Slip Away" - 2:24
"Cold Enough to Kill" - 4:41
"Hello Jesus" - 2:16
"Empathise" - 4:07 
"See Thru the Dark" - 2:59
"Kiss Mine" - 3:31
"Smile" -  2:36
"The Little Black Egg" (Michael Stone) - 3:09

Personnel
Tracy Tracy - lead vocals, tambourine
Paul Court - guitar, vocals
Tig Williams - drums
Paul Sampson - bass
Anthony Harty - bass

References

1992 albums
The Primitives albums
Albums produced by Ian Broudie
Albums produced by Ed Buller
RCA Records albums